Events from the year 1630 in Ireland.

Incumbent
 Monarch: Charles I

Events
 Lismore Cathedral is destroyed.
 Mícheál Ó Cléirigh's Félire na naomh nÉrennach ("Calendar of Irish Saints" or "Martyrology of Donegal") is completed.

Births
Richard Talbot, 1st Earl of Tyrconnell, soldier (d. 1691)
Nicholas Ward, politician (d. after 1666)
Approximate date
Alexander Fitton, lawyer and politician (d. 1698)
John Keating, judge (d. 1691, committed suicide)
Hugh Reily, lawyer and politician (d. 1695)

Deaths
February 20 – James "Spanish" Blake, spy (b. after 1560)
June 3 – Thomas Fitzmaurice, 18th Baron Kerry, soldier (b. 1574)
Approximate date – Lughaidh Ó Cléirigh, poet and historian (b. before 1603)

References

 
1630s in Ireland
Ireland
Years of the 17th century in Ireland